Cocoon may refer to:
Cocoon (silk), a pupal casing made by moth caterpillars and other insect larvae
Apache Cocoon, web development software
Cocoon (film), a 1985 science fiction-fantasy film
Cocoon: The Return, 1988 sequel to Cocoon
Cocoon (video game), an upcoming video game published by Annapurna Interactive
Kakuna (Pokémon), a species of Pokémon, known as Cocoon in the original Japanese version
"Cocoon", a short story by Greg Egan in his collection Luminous
Cocoon, a fictional world in the video game Final Fantasy XIII
"Cocoon" (Hawaii Five-O), an episode of 1968 TV series Hawaii Five-O
"Ka ʻōwili ʻōka’i", an episode of 2010 TV series Hawaii Five-0 and remake of the 1968 episode whose alternative title is "Cocoon"
Cocoon, a 1997 English translation of 1963 Marathi language novel Kosala by Bhalchandra Nemade

Music
Cocoon Recordings, a German record label
Cocoon (band), a French band
Cocoon (club), a techno club in Frankfurt am Main, Germany
Cocoon (Meg & Dia album), 2011
Cocoon (Pandelis Karayorgis album), 2013
Cocoon (Chara album), 2012
The Cocoon 2019 debut album of Richard Henshall
Cocoon, an album by Yorico
"Cocoon" (Anna Tsuchiya song)
"Cocoon" (Björk song), 2001
"Cocoon" (Milky Chance song), 2016
"Cocoon" (Catfish and the Bottlemen song), 2014
"Cocoon", a song by Bernard Butler from Friends and Lovers
"Cocoon", a song by The Decemberists from Castaways and Cutouts
"Cocoon", a song by Guster from Parachute
"Cocoon", a song by Jack Johnson from On and On
"Cocoon", a song by Migos
"Cocoon", an instrumental by Timerider, the original theme music for the UK TV programme The Hit Man and Her

See also
Cocooning, confining oneself to one's home to avoid external danger